Ahmadzadeh is a surname. Notable people with the surname include:

Farshad Ahmadzadeh (born 1992), Iranian footballer
Habib Ahmadzadeh, Iranian writer
Hashim Ahmadzadeh, Iranian writer and Kurdish scholar
Mohammad Ahmadzadeh (born 1961), Iranian footballer and manager
Ruhollah Ahmadzadeh (born 1956), Iranian politician